Damjan may refer to:

People 
 Damjan (given name)
 Jernej Damjan (born 1983), Slovenian ski jumper

Places 
 Damjan-Fortuz, a village in Albania
 Damjan, Iran
 Damjan, Radoviš, North Macedonia